Ryu Jin (born Im Yoo-jin on November 16, 1972) is a South Korean actor.

Filmography

Television series
 The Real Has Come! as Geum Sang-baek (KBS2, 2023)  
Be My Dream Family (KBS, 2021)
Homemade Love Story as Son Jeong-hoo (KBS, 2020–21)
Run, Jang-mi (SBS, 2014-2015)
Into the Flames (TV Chosun, 2012)
Prime Minister & I (KBS2, 2013-2014)
Standby (MBC, 2012)  
A Thousand Kisses (MBC, 2011)
Baby Faced Beauty (KBS2, 2011)
Secret Agent Miss Oh (KBS2, 2010)
Loving You a Thousand Times (SBS, 2009)
General Hospital 2 (MBC, 2008)
Formidable Rivals (KBS2, 2008) (cameo)
Mom's Dead Upset (KBS2, 2008)
Capital Scandal (KBS2, 2007)
Love Truly (MBC, 2006)
Ballad of Seodong (SBS, 2005)
Three Leaf Clover (SBS, 2005)
Oh! Pil-seung, Bong Soon-young (KBS2, 2004)
War of the Roses (MBC, 2004)
Summer Scent (KBS2, 2003)
Trio (MBC, 2002)
Who's My Love? (KBS2, 2002)
Pure Heart (KBS2, 2001)
Stock Flower (KBS2, 2001)
Air Force (MBC, 2000)
  More Than Love (In Tae-Kang)  (MBC,2000)
Not Anyone Can Love (MBC, 2000)
Sunrise, Moonrise (KBS1, 1999)
Love In 3 Colors (KBS2, 1999)
Romance (SBS, 1998)

Film 
The Elephant on the Bike (2007)
Dead Friend (2004)
Deep Sorrow (1997)

Variety show 
 Daughter Thieves (๋JTBC, 2022) ; Cast 
Dad! Where Are We Going? Season 2 (MBC, 2014)

Awards
 2021 KBS Drama Awards :Excellence Award, Actor in a Daily Drama	  (Be My Dream Family) 
 2012 MBC Entertainment Awards: Popularity Award in a Sitcom/Comedy (Standby)
 2001 KBS Drama Awards: Popularity Award (Stock Flower)
 1999 KBS Drama Awards: Best New Actor, Photogenic Award
 1998 SBS Drama Awards: Best New Actor (Romance)

References

External links
 Ryu Jin at G.G Entertainment 
 
 
 

South Korean male film actors
South Korean male television actors
Male actors from Seoul
1972 births
Living people
Gachon University alumni